Hershey School of Musical Art was an American school located in Chicago, Illinois.

History
It was established within the Hershey Music Hall in 1875 by Sara Hershey and William Smythe Babcock Mathews, attaining special success in its departments of organ, voice, and composition. Clarence Eddy was general director almost from the first, and it was here that in 1877-79 he gave a series of 100 organ recitals without repeating any work. In 1879, Hershey and Eddy married, and in 1885, they discontinued the School.

Hershey Music Hall
Hershey Music Hall was located at 83 & 85 Madison Street. It was built by Sara Hershey's father, Benjamin. Situated opposite McVicker's Theater, it was capable of seating 800 to 1,000 persons. It was furnished with a three manual concert organ built by Johnson & Son, and a Stoneway and Sons' Centennial Grand Piano.

References

Bibliography

Music schools in Illinois
1875 establishments in Illinois
Educational institutions established in 1875
Defunct schools of the performing arts in the United States
Defunct private schools in Chicago
Music of Chicago